The River Mourne is a river in County Tyrone (between Strabane and Newtownstewart), Northern Ireland, and is a tributary of the River Foyle It is formed at the meetings of the River Derg and River Strule below Ardstraw. At Strabane it joins with the River Finn to form the River Foyle. Fishing is largely for salmon, grilse and sea trout. Other species such as Common Roach , Common Minnow, Northern Pike, European Eel, Perch and Sticklebacks can also be found in different stretches of the River on occasion. 

The traditional folk song "The Moorlough Shore" (also called The Maid of Mourne Shore) refers to names and places along the river.

References

External links
Salmon fishing on the River Mourne, from Salmon Ireland

Mourne